Geneva is located in Alexandria, Louisiana.  It was added to the National Register of Historic Places on December 5, 1984.

It was listed as one result of a study of 10 Neo-Classical farm-plantation houses along Bayou Rapides.  As for several of the others (Eden, China Grove, Hope, Island Home, Longview), Geneva was modified by addition of hood along its original gallery, termed a false gallery, which provides additional protection from the rain, detracting somewhat but not greatly from its original appearance.

References

Houses on the National Register of Historic Places in Louisiana
Federal architecture in Louisiana
Houses completed in 1829
Houses in Alexandria, Louisiana
National Register of Historic Places in Rapides Parish, Louisiana
1829 establishments in Louisiana